Lantern laws refer to the 18th-century legal code in New York City that mandated Black, Mixed Race, and Indigenous people carry candle lanterns while walking the streets after dark and not in company of a white person.

Interpretations in Black studies 

University of Texas at Austin Professor Simone Browne's most recent book, Dark Matters: On the Surveillance of Blackness, published by Duke University Press in 2015, argues that the history of the policing of Black people in and after the institution of Chattel slavery remains central to contemporary technologies and practices of surveillance. Browne argues that the candle lantern is an early example of a "supervisory technology,"  citing that during the period any white person was deputized to stop any Black, Mixed Race, and Indigenous person caught walking without the presence of one of these illuminating apparatuses. Browne proposes that this precedented first devised and implemented during the colonial era established the "legal framework for stop-and-frisk policing practices...long before our contemporary era." She concludes, The law carried a number of possible punishments for individuals in violation of the mandate. 

In R. Joshua Scannell's City University of New York dissertation "Electric Light: Automating the Carceral State During the Quantification of Everything," he extends Browne's work, to connect Lantern Laws in the past with the NYPD's present-day militarization of "high-intensity artificial lights, flood lights or the flashing roof lights from the police cars throughout the night in certain housing projects" which "[subject] people to violent illumination."

The artist Kapwani Kwanga has explored the history of forced illumination in her work.

References

History of African-American civil rights
History of racial segregation in the United States
History of racism in New York (state)
African-American history of New York (state)